A heavy hauler is a very large transporter for moving oversize loads too large for road travel without an escort and special permit.

A heavy hauler typically consists of a Ballast Tractor and hydraulic modular trailer.  Some trailers may have independently steerable wheels, and several might be towed by one or more tractor units in a train.

Self-propelled modular transporters (SPMT), some featuring a dozen or more self-steering axles with scores of rubber tires to spread out a load, are increasingly being manufactured.  Working in coordinated teams, heavy haulers are able to  carry loads exceeding 100 tons.

Applications
In some cases, a heavy hauler is designed and constructed to move a particular load on a one-off or short-term basis. Girder bridge (lowboy) trailers are another specialist heavy hauler, specifically for the transport of large power transformers.

Typical loads moved by heavy haulers under escort on highways include giant boilers and pressure vessels used in the chemical industry, industrial plants, prefabricated sections for construction projects, giant power transformers, turbines, and houses (generally made of timber).

There are some shipbuilding companies using SPMT for carrying ship parts and constructing ships in China. They have saved millions of dollars formerly spent transporting loads using gantry cranes.

See also
Ballast tractor
Construction equipment
HET
Self-propelled modular transporter
Tank transporter
Hydraulic modular trailer

References

Trucks
Engineering vehicles